Anarsia vinsonella is a moth of the  family Gelechiidae. It is found on Mauritius and Réunion in the Indian Ocean.

References
 Viette, P. 1957c. Lépidoptères (excepté les Tordeuses et les Géométrides). – In: La Faune entomologique de l'Ile de la Réunion. I. - Mémoires de l'Institut scientifique de Madagascar (E)8:137–226; pls. 1–4.

vinsonella
Moths described in 1957
Moths of Africa